Alan Geoffrey Wilson (born 1 June 1942) is a former English cricketer.  Wilson was a right-handed batsman who bowled right-arm medium pace.  He was born in Kendal, Westmorland.

Wilson made his debut for Cumberland in the 1963 Minor Counties Championship against Durham.  He continued to represent Cumberland sporadically to 1984, playing 57 Minor Counties Championship matches.  Toward the end of his career he played two MCCA Knockout Trophy matches against Northumberland in 1983 and Cheshire in 1984.  He played his only List A match in 1984, when Cumberland played Derbyshire in the NatWest Trophy.  In this match he scored 10 runs before being dismissed by Kim Barnett.  Wilson captained Cumberland in this match.

References

External links

1942 births
Living people
Sportspeople from Kendal
Cricketers from Cumbria
English cricketers
Cumberland cricketers
Cumberland cricket captains